Joshua Benjamin Levin (born March 15, 1980) is an American writer and the national editor at Slate magazine. Levin also hosts the magazine's sports podcast, Hang Up and Listen.

Biography

Early life
Levin was born and raised in New Orleans, Louisiana. He attended Brown University, where he earned degrees in computer science and history.

Career
After graduating from Brown University, Levin began his journalism career as an intern at the Washington City Paper in Washington, D.C. He joined Slate in 2003, where he is currently national editor.

In addition to writing and editing, he also hosts Slates sports podcast Hang Up and Listen with the journalist Stefan Fatsis and Kabir Sangha.

In 2013, for Slate, Levin wrote an article on Linda Taylor, a woman that was dubbed by the Chicago Tribune and Ronald Reagan as a "welfare queen." The article, which explored Taylor's history of criminal acts, some allegedly neglected by the authorities and more serious than those for which she was convicted, was praised by media sources. The Washington Monthly described Levin's article as "the most fascinating true crime read of the year."

In 2019, Levin wrote The Queen: The Forgotten Life Behind an American Myth. The book expanded upon the life of Linda Taylor and her repeated acts of fraud and theft. The book won the 2019 National Book Critics Circle Award (Biography). Levin also hosted the Slate podcast, The Queen, a four-episode mini series about Linda Taylor and Reagan Era politics, along with two bonus episodes.

Awards
Association of Alternative Newsweeklies' Media Reporting/Criticism Award in 2004 — for the article titled "Off Target", co-written with Erik Wemple, published in the Washington City Paper which helped to break the Jayson Blair plagiarism scandal.

References

External links
Official homepage
 

1980 births
Living people
Writers from New Orleans
Brown University alumni
Slate (magazine) people
Journalists from Louisiana
American male journalists
21st-century American journalists
21st-century American male writers